The Bottle Rock Power Plant  (BRPP) is a geothermal power plant in the Glenbrook Area of Lake County, California, United States.

Location

The Bottle Rock Power Plant is within a  leasehold near the town of Cobb on High Valley Road, Glenbrook Area, Lake County.
It is in the Geyser Known Geothermal Resource Area (The Geysers).
The Geysers is the world's largest geothermal field.
Small resort communities along the main access roads include Whispering Pines, Forest Lake, Cobb, Pine Grove, Hobergs and Loch Lomond.
The steam supply field is on the Lake-Sonoma County Line.
It is a few miles northwest of Cobb Mountain, southwest of Glenbrook and near the northern border of the Geysers KGRA.

Plant

Power is delivered by a single 55 MW dry-steam geothermal turbine-generator from Fuji Electric.
The plant includes a steam field with three well pads, a Stretford system designed by Peabody Energy to abate hydrogen sulfide, a cooling tower and condenser system.

History

DWR (1980–2001)
The BRPP was first owned by the California Department of Water Resources (DWR).
It was certified in November 1980 and after construction started operation in February 1985.
DWR suspended operation in November 1990 because the steam field was only producing around 15 MW.
The plant was put into cold stand-by status.
DWR began efforts to sell the facility.

BRP (2001–2015)

In May 2001 the Bottle Rock Power Corporation (BRPC) took over ownership.
US Renewables Group and Riverstone-Carlyle took over the project and funded BRP Holdco, which owned Bottle Rock Power (BRP).
In December 2006 ownership was transferred from BRPC to BRP.
The California Energy Commission approved restart of operations by BRP after various design changes at the facility.
The power plant came online on 1 October 2007.
In the period from 2008 to 2014 the steam turbine facility generated around 75,000 MWH annually.
Cobb residents complained about the traffic, noise, grading and environmental management at the power plant during this period.
On 1 April 2015 BRP announced the plant was being shut down and placed in standby mode.

BCEP (2015–present)

On 20 November 2015 Baseload Clean Energy Partners (BCEP) bought BRP Holdco from US Renewables Group and Riverstone-Carlyle.
BCEP is owned and operated by AltaRock Energy.
It planned to upgrade the plant to include energy storage so it could optimize energy delivery based on demand.
In January 2019 AltaRock Energy said it planned to build and test a new thermoelectric generator exploiting the Seebeck effect at the Bottle Rock facility.
The project was supported by the Electric Program Investment Charge (EPIC) program of the California Energy Commission.
If successful, the approach would make smaller scale geothermal plants more economically viable.

Notes

Sources

 

Geothermal power stations in California